Hines Township is a township in Beltrami County, Minnesota, United States. The population was 674 as of the 2000 census.

Geography

The west half of the city of Blackduck is within this township geographically but is a separate entity.

History
Hines Township Was Organized In : 1919

Unincorporated towns
 Hines at 
(This list is based on USGS data and may include former settlements.)

Major highways
  U.S. Route 71
  Minnesota State Highway 72

Lakes
 Blackduck Lake
 Crandall Lake
 Dutchman Lake (north half)
 Erickson Lake (northeast quarter)
 Flenner Lake
 Funk Lake
 Hanson Lake (north edge)
 Smith Lake (vast majority)

Adjacent townships
 Langor Township (north)
 Hornet Township (northeast)
 Summit Township (east)
 Taylor Township (south)
 Hagali Township (west)
 O'Brien Township (northwest)

Cemeteries
The township contains Lakeview Cemetery.

Demographics
As of the census of 2000, there were 674 people, 244 households, and 192 families residing in the township.  The population density was 22.1 people per square mile (8.5/km2).  There were 312 housing units at an average density of 10.2/sq mi (3.9/km2).  The racial makeup of the township was 96.88% White, 2.08% Native American, 0.15% Asian, and 0.89% from two or more races. Hispanic or Latino of any race were 1.19% of the population.

There were 244 households, out of which 32.4% had children under the age of 18 living with them, 68.9% were married couples living together, 4.9% had a female householder with no husband present, and 21.3% were non-families. 17.6% of all households were made up of individuals, and 6.1% had someone living alone who was 65 years of age or older.  The average household size was 2.76 and the average family size was 3.14.

In the township the population was spread out, with 27.2% under the age of 18, 7.0% from 18 to 24, 24.5% from 25 to 44, 28.2% from 45 to 64, and 13.2% who were 65 years of age or older.  The median age was 39 years. For every 100 females, there were 110.0 males.  For every 100 females age 18 and over, there were 108.1 males.

The median income for a household in the township was $42,292, and the median income for a family was $46,250. Males had a median income of $33,750 versus $23,571 for females. The per capita income for the township was $17,342.  About 6.5% of families and 9.3% of the population were below the poverty line, including 12.0% of those under age 18 and 22.0% of those age 65 or over.

References
 United States National Atlas
 United States Census Bureau 2007 TIGER/Line Shapefiles
 United States Board on Geographic Names (GNIS)

Townships in Beltrami County, Minnesota
Townships in Minnesota